Mill Gap (also Green Hill, Millgap, or Rucksmanville) is an unincorporated community and small rural village in Highland County, Virginia, United States. The community is located near a water gap of the same name that separates the ridges of Lantz Mountain and Little Mountain through which the East Back Creek flows. As of 2015, the community consists only of a general store and a church, with attached residences.

References

Unincorporated communities in Highland County, Virginia
Unincorporated communities in Virginia
Water gaps of the United States